Yazdan-Friy Shapur or Yazdan-Friy-Shabuhr (Middle Persian: yazdān-friy-šābuhr, New Persian: یزدان‌فرای شاپور) was a 4th-century Sasanian queen (banbishn) and the wife of the Sasanian king (shah) Shapur III. She has been immortalized by an onyx seal of remarkable quality, where she is shown wearing the horns of a ram. The seal is now in the Cabinet des Médailles, France.

References

Sources 
 

4th-century Iranian people
4th-century deaths
Sasanian queens
4th-century women